The Cabinet of Milomir Minić was elected on 25 October 2000, after the defeat of Slobodan Milošević on the presidential election. At that point, and after the resignation of the Serbian Prime Minister Mirko Marjanović, it became clear that the Socialist Party of Serbia would lose the next early parliamentary election, so this transitional government was formed, based on the agreement signed on 16 October by Socialist Party of Serbia (SPS), Democratic Opposition of Serbia (DOS) and Serbian Renewal Movement (SPO).

Cabinet members

See also
Cabinet of Serbia (2001–04)
Cabinet of Serbia (2004–07)
Cabinet of Serbia (2007–08)
Cabinet of Serbia (2008–12)
Cabinet of Serbia (2012–14)
Cabinet of Serbia

References

Serbia
2000 establishments in Serbia
2001 disestablishments in Serbia
Cabinets established in 2000
Cabinets disestablished in 2001